The 2014–15 Welsh Premier League (known as the Corbett Sports Welsh Premier League for sponsorship reasons) was the 23rd season of the Welsh Premier League, the highest football league within Wales since its establishment in 1992. The season began on 22 August 2014. The New Saints claimed their ninth Welsh top flight championship on 14 March 2015 after a 3–0 win against nearest rivals in the table Bala Town.

Teams

Afan Lido were relegated out of the Welsh Premier League the previous season, while Cefn Druids were promoted as winners of the Cymru Alliance.

Stadia and locations

Personnel and kits

League table

Results
Teams play each other twice on a home and away basis, before the league is split into two groups at the end of January 2015 – the top six and the bottom six.

Matches 1–22

Matches 23–32

Top six

Bottom six

UEFA Europa League play-offs
Teams who finished in positions fourth to seventh at the end of the regular season took part in play-offs to determine the third participant for the 2015–16 UEFA Europa League.

Semi-finals

Final

Season statistics

Top goalscorers

Hat-tricks

4 Player scored 4 goals

References
The league's rules are contained as a section of the Handbook of the Football Association of Wales.

External links

Cymru Premier seasons
1
Wales